Cowboy Songs is a compilation album of phonograph records by Bing Crosby released in 1939 featuring Western songs.

Background
Crosby had recorded cowboy songs for the first time in 1933 and he had a huge hit with "The Last Round-Up" that year on the Brunswick label. He recorded "Home on the Range" for the first time then also. Commenting on these early recordings, the writer Gary Giddins said "…it anticipated the golden age of gentle-voiced singing cowboys and the Irish sentiment of John Ford westerns that followed on their heels."

Moving on to the Decca label, Crosby had huge hits with "I’m an Old Cowhand", "Empty Saddles" and "Mexicali Rose". He also charted with "My Little Buckaroo" and "There’s a Gold Mine in the Sky". Giddins considered Bing's recordings in his book  saying: "The most impressive of his new cowboy songs (including "We’ll Rest at the End of the Trail", "A Roundup Lullaby", "Empty Saddles") was "Twilight on the Trail", a lament introduced that year by Fuzzy Knight in The Trail of the Lonesome Pine and sung by Bing as though it were an old western hymn. That’s how it may have sounded to President Roosevelt, who declared it his favorite song after "Home on the Range"; Mrs. Roosevelt requested Bing’s record for the Roosevelt Library."

Original track listing
These previously issued songs were featured on a 6-disc, 78 rpm album set, Decca Album No. 69.

Disc 1: (2676)

Disc 2: (2677)

Disc 3: (2678)

Disc 4: (2679)

Disc 5: (2237)

Disc 6: (2001)

References

Bing Crosby compilation albums
1939 compilation albums
Decca Records compilation albums
Country music compilation albums
Country albums by American artists